Anna Sorokina may refer to:

 Anna Sorokina (actress) (born 1981), Russian stage, film, and television actress
 Anna Sorokina (biathlon) (born 1981), Russian biathlete
 Anna Sorokin (born 1991), Russian-born German convicted fraudster
 Anna Kulinich-Sorokina (born 1992), Russian Paralympian athlete.